Reader Rabbit's Reading Development Library is a series of four edutainment games from The Learning Company as part of the Reader Rabbit franchise. The first two games were developed in October 1994, the third was developed in 1995 and the last one was developed in 1996. The products make use of interactive storybooks based on fairy tales to help early readers broaden their reading, vocabulary, writing and word recognition skills. Each number in the title corresponds to the reading level of the reader they are aimed at.

Gameplay
In each game, the player has two storybooks to choose from. There are three versions of each story, the first told by Sam the narrator called the "Classic" version and the latter two as different perspectives of characters from the story. The story can be read entirely by the narrator or it can be read by the user with guidelines. The games also include three activities to further enhance learning to read. With both the manual and automatic modes, users can read the stories at their own pace.

Books

Availability
"Reader Rabbit's Reading Development Library 2" was included in "Reader Rabbit's Complete Learn to Read System" on the second CD simply title "Classic Tales".

Reception

The games were positively reviewed and praised primarily for the variety of retelling the story from multiple points of view.

See also
 Disney's Animated Storybook
 Living Books
 Magic Tales
 Playtoons
 The Kidstory Series

References

External links
 
 
 
 

1994 video games
1995 video games
1996 video games
The Learning Company games
Reader Rabbit
Children's educational video games
Software for children
Video game franchises
Windows games
Classic Mac OS games
Video games developed in the United States